Mostar Sevdah Reunion is a world-fusion musical ensemble from Mostar, Bosnia and Herzegovina playing almost exclusively sevdalinka fused with contemporary musical styles. The band is composed of experienced musicians and often collaborates with renowned musicians in the field of Roma music: they made two albums with Šaban Bajramović and two albums with Ljiljana Buttler. Ljiljana frequently toured with the band until her death in 2010.

The band was formed by Dragi Šestić in Mostar in 1998. It started out as a group of local, talented and experienced musicians. They were old friends who came together again in summer 1999 to record their first album.
 
Their first CD was released 1999. Since then they became popular with world music audiences, performing at various world music festivals and receiving a number of music awards.  

The band members are: Mišo Petrović (lead guitar), Sandi Duraković (guitar), Nermin Alukić Čerkez (vocal and guitar), Marko Jakovljević (bass), Gabrijel Prusina (piano), Senad Trnovac (drums) and Vanja Radoja (violin).

Discography

 Mostar Sevdah Reunion: «Mostar Sevdah Reunion» (1999)
 Mostar Sevdah Reunion presents Šaban Bajramović: «A Gypsy Legend» (2001)
 Ljiljana Buttler: «The Mother of Gypsy Soul» (2002)
 Mostar Sevdah Reunion: «A Secret Gate» (2003)
 Mostar Sevdah Reunion and Ljiljana Buttler: «The Legends of Life» (2005)
 Mostar Sevdah Reunion: «Šaban» (2006)
 Mostar Sevdah Reunion: «Café Sevdah» (2007)
 Ljiljana Buttler: «Frozen Roses» (2009)
 Mostar Sevdah Reunion: «Tales from a Forgotten City» (2013)
 Mostar Sevdah Reunion: «Kings of Sevdah» (2016)
 Mostar Sevdah Reunion presents Sreta: «The Balkan Autumn» (2018)
 Mostar Sevdah Reunion: «Lady SIngs The Balkan Blues» (2022)

Awards

 "Davorin" Bosnian Music Awards: Special Award 2002
 "Davorin" Bosnian Music Awards: The Best Ethno Album Of The Year 2003 (for "The Mother of Gypsy Soul: Ljiljana Buttler")
 "Davorin" Bosnian Music Awards: The Best Album Of The Year 2004

Films

 Mostar Sevdah Reunion - by Pjer Žalica 2000
 Sevdah the Bridge that Survived - by Mira Erdevički 2005
 Tales From A Forgotten City - by Amir Grabus 2013

External links

Official website of MSR
Mostar Sevdah Reunion- Sluzbena stranica
Current record label- Snail Records
Initial record label 

Sevdalinka
Bosnia and Herzegovina musical groups
Indexi Award winners